Charlotte Michelle Taylor (born 2 February 1994) is an English cricketer who plays for Hampshire and Southern Vipers, and has previously played for Southern Brave. Taylor is an off spin bowler, and was the top wicket taker at the 2020 Rachael Heyhoe Flint Trophy.

Personal life
Taylor is from New Milton, Hampshire, England, and went to The Arnewood School. She now lives in Southampton, near to the Rose Bowl cricket ground, and works in customer services for an aerospace company. Her uncle Neil played minor counties cricket, and her father is the current chairman of New Milton Cricket Club. Both of them have played club cricket for New Milton Cricket Club.

Career
Taylor started playing cricket for New Milton under-9s, and later joined Hursley Ladies cricket team. In 2010, she started playing for Hampshire as a batter. In 2015, Taylor was part of the Hampshire side that were promoted from Division 3 to Division 2 of the Women's County Championship. In the same year, Taylor played club cricket for Fernhill Cricket Club, taking 15 wickets in the season. In 2017, Taylor suffered a cruciate ligament tear, which meant she was unable to play for two years. After her injury, Taylor focused on her bowling. She is now an off spinner who bowls mainly arm balls.

In 2020, Taylor was called up to the Southern Vipers squad for the Rachael Heyhoe Flint Trophy, as an injury replacement. After testing negative for COVID-19, Taylor was initially asked to commentate for BBC Radio Solent on the Vipers match against the South East Stars. Instead, Taylor was selected to play in the match, where she took 2/13 from seven overs. In a later match against Western Storm, she took 4/41. In the Rachael Heyhoe Flint Trophy final against Northern Diamonds, Taylor took 6 wickets for 34 runs, as Vipers won the match and the tournament. She was awarded the player of the match award in the final, and her bowling figures were the best of any player in the Rachael Heyhoe Flint Trophy. In total, Taylor played five matches in the competition, taking 15 wickets, more than any other player. Her bowling average was just above 10, and her strike rate was 18 balls per wicket. Taylor was included in the Vipers squad for the 2021 season, and was signed by Southern Brave for the inaugural season of The Hundred. She played for them in three matches but only managed to get one wicket. In the 2021 Rachael Heyhoe Flint Trophy, she took 13 wickets, the most of any Vipers player, at an average of 18.15. She took 9 wickets for Southern Vipers in the 2022 Rachael Heyhoe Flint Trophy, at an average of 30.33.

References

External links
 
 

1994 births
Living people
Hampshire women cricketers
People from New Milton
Southern Vipers cricketers
Southern Brave cricketers